The 2019 FBD Insurance League (sometimes referred to as the Connacht SFL) was an inter-county Gaelic football competition in the province of Connacht. All five Connacht county teams participated, but there are no college or university teams.

After the 2018 tournament featured a busy schedule with several postponements due to bad weather, the 2019 tournament was a straight knockout with teams playing just one or two games (as opposed to 4 games in the previous year).

The competition featured an historic penalty shootout in which Mayo defeated Leitrim by 4-1 to advance to the semi-final after the teams could not be separated following seventy minutes of play.

Competition format
The competition was a straight knockout. Drawn games went a penalty shoot-out without the playing of extra-time. This occurred in Mayo v Leitrim.

Fixtures and results

References

FBD Insurance League
FBD Insurance League